Fausto Corrêa da Silva (born May 3, 1950) commonly known as Faustão (literally Big Fausto), is a Brazilian television presenter. He is best known as the host of long-running Sunday afternoon show Domingão do Faustão, which premiered in 1989.

Career

Television

Cinema

References

1950 births
Living people
People from Porto Ferreira
Brazilian television presenters
Brazilian television personalities